Gioacchino Alemagna (sometimes spelled Giacchino; May 13, 1892 - September 23, 1974), was an Italian pastry chef and entrepreneur, and the founder of the Alemagna food company.

Biography 

Alemagna was born on 13 May 1892, in Melegnano, a commune in Lombardy, Italy. He set up his first confectionery bakery in Milan in the 1920s, and opened his own pastry shop in 1925, where he directly sold his products. In 1933, he expanded his business, with a pastry shop adjacent to Milan's Piazza del Duomo. The shop became a popular spot in the prewar years, thanks to the production and sale of panettone, an Alemagna specialty. Alemagna had the largest factory in Milan's Via Silva, which had more than 30 baking ovens and 2,000 employees. After the World War II, Gioacchino retired and sold the company to his son Alberto. Gioacchino died in Milan September 23, 1974.

References 

Italian chefs
1892 births
1974 deaths
People from Melegnano